Kevin Cunningham (11 August 1939 – 4 January 2023) was a member of Australia's first Paralympic Games Team. He participated at the 1960 Rome and 1968 Tel Aviv Paralympic Games.

Personal
He was born on 11 August 1939 in Perth, Western Australia. His parents were Irene and Edward.  His mother Irene died when he was six and was brought up by his grandmother.  He attended Jolimont School and Perth Technical College.  He undertook an apprenticeship at SW Hart & Company.  In 1957, he was involved in a motor vehicle accident and thrown out of T-Model Ford. He was in a coma for three weeks a g  . His rehabitation was undertaken Shenton Park Rehabilitation Centre. In 1966, he married Maureen, a nurse from Shenton Park Rehabilitation Centre.

Career

Paralympic Games

Cunningham's interest in Paralympic sport stemmed from his time at Shenton Park Rehabilitation Centre where he witnessed residents training for the International Stoke Mandeville Games.  He participated at the 1960 Rome Games, in wheelchair fencing and wheelchair basketball. He was not selected for 1964 Tokyo Games due to an injury in selection trials in Adelaide. He participated in the 1968 Tel Aviv Games in men's slalom C in athletics and wheelchair basketball. Cunningham won silver medals in both of these events.

Whilst celebrating 50 years of Paralympic sport, in 2010, Cunningham was honoured as a member of the Australian wheelchair basketball team which competed at the 1960 Rome Games alongside his teammates; Kevin Coombs, Gary Hooper, Bill Mather-Brown, Bruno Moretti, and Chris O'Brian (pictured on the right).

Commonwealth Paraplegic Games

Cunningham participated in three Commonwealth Paraplegic Games. At the 1962 Perth Games, he competed in many events and won gold medals in the pentathlon and men's wheelchair basketball.  At the 1966 Kingston Games, he won a gold medal in track relay, 3 silver and two bronze medals in basketball and track and field events.  He competed at the 1970 Games in Edinburgh, Scotland and then retired from Paralympic sport.

References

External links
 Kevin Cunningham interviewed by Ian Jobling in the Australian Centre for Paralympic Studies oral history project, National Library of Australia, 2011

Paralympic athletes of Australia
Paralympic wheelchair basketball players of Australia
Paralympic wheelchair fencers of Australia
Wheelchair basketball players at the 1960 Summer Paralympics
Wheelchair fencers at the 1960 Summer Paralympics
Athletes (track and field) at the 1968 Summer Paralympics
Wheelchair basketball players at the 1968 Summer Paralympics
Wheelchair category Paralympic competitors
Australian amputees
Athletes from Perth, Western Australia
1939 births
Living people
Australian male fencers